Safarovo (Säfär) is a rural locality (a selo) and the administrative centre of Safarovsky Selsoviet, Uchalinsky District, Bashkortostan, Russia. The population was 1,410 as of 2010. There are 18 streets.

Geography 
Safarovo is located 21 km northeast of Uchaly (the district's administrative centre) by road. Ilchino is the nearest rural locality.

References 

Rural localities in Uchalinsky District